Arete (minor planet designation: 197 Arete) is an asteroid in the asteroid belt. It has a very bright surface, even so when compared to other rocky S-type asteroid.

It was discovered by J. Palisa on May 21, 1879, and named after Arete, the mother of Nausicaa in Homer's The Odyssey. Every 18 years, this asteroid approaches within 0.04 AU of 4 Vesta. During these encounters, Vesta causes a gravitational perturbation of Arete, allowing the mass of Vesta to be directly determined.

Photometric observations during 1984 showed a rotation period of 6.54 ± 0.02 hours and a brightness variation of 0.10 ± 0.01 in magnitude. The light curve shows "four well defined extrema with two asymmetric maxima".

References

External links 
 
 

Background asteroids
Arete
Arete
S-type asteroids (Tholen)
S-type asteroids (SMASS)
18790521